Salticus latidentatus is a species of jumping spider that occurs in Russia, Mongolia and China, reaching into South China. The female is about four mm long. The carapace of the female is dark reddish brown anteriorly and somewhat lighter on the thorax. The greyish-white abdomen is oval and about twice as long as broad. The legs bear long black and white stripes.

Footnotes

References
 (2000): An Introduction to the Spiders of South East Asia. Malaysian Nature Society, Kuala Lumpur.
 (2007): The world spider catalog, version 8.0. American Museum of Natural History.

Salticidae
Spiders of Russia
Spiders of Asia
Spiders described in 1951